Ehlscheid is a municipality in the district of Neuwied, in Rhineland-Palatinate, Germany.
Part of the municipality are also three , namely Forsthaus Gommerscheid, Hof Talblick and Talhof.
(Forsthaus may be translated as forester's lodge, Hof (in that case) as homestead).

On June 1, 1958, an open-air bath was opened in Ehlscheid. It was closed in 2012 due to technical problems. In 2016, the pool was leveled and filled with earth.

The Rockefeller family has its roots in Ehlscheid, but also in the abandoned village of Rockenfeld and in Fahr (both today part of Neuwied).

References

Neuwied (district)